First Daughter is a 2004 American romantic comedy-drama film released by 20th Century Fox. It stars Katie Holmes as Samantha MacKenzie, daughter of the President of the United States, who enrolls at college and develops a relationship with another student (Marc Blucas). The film follows Samantha as she experiences a new sense of freedom during her time away from the White House, and the advantages and disadvantages of her college life. It co-stars Michael Keaton as the President of the United States and Amerie as Samantha's roommate, Mia Thompson.

The film was directed by Forest Whitaker, written by Jessica Bendinger and Kate Kondell from a story by Bendinger and Jerry O'Connell, and produced by John Davis. Whitaker likened First Daughter to a fairy tale, characterizing it as "the story of a princess who leaves the 'castle' [the White House] to go out in the world to discover who and what she is." The film languished in "development hell" for several years, due to competition against Chasing Liberty, and was further delayed after its completion. It was not a commercial success upon its release, and received negative reviews.

Plot
Samantha MacKenzie is the only child of U.S. President John MacKenzie. Because of her father's political career, she has been in the public eye her entire life and spent most of her high school years in the White House. Having to deal with lack of privacy and public scrutiny for the most ridiculous things, Sam has had a sheltered existence and her father has trouble letting her have more freedom yet is too busy to spend time with her.

Though her mother Melanie is supportive, she still stands by her husband's decisions, leaving Sam feeling restricted from having a normal life. Accompanied by Secret Service agents everywhere she goes, and with her father running for re-election, Sam finally believes she has the chance to break out of her cocoon when she is given the opportunity to attend college in California.

At school, Sam ends up sharing a dorm room with boy-crazed Mia Thompson, who is hesitant at first to room with the first daughter, but eventually warms to her. After her Secret Service agents tackle a student brandishing a water gun at a pool party and hastily evacuate her from the premises, she insists that her detail be reduced to just two agents, which her father begrudgingly agrees to. Settling into some semblance of normalcy, she meets and becomes interested in fellow student James Lansome, her resident advisor.

James helps her avoid paparazzi, escape her security team, and experience life as a normal girl. They discuss their deepest thoughts and wishes, and Sam tells him that although she is never alone, she is often lonely. She says she always wanted to get in an old Volkswagen and drive herself off to college, with no babysitters or parents. To thank James and Mia for their tolerance of her complicated world, Sam flies them home to D.C. to attend a ball, with the dresses delivered to her personally by Vera Wang. Outside the ball, a protest causes her security team to evacuate her again, when she discovers that James is actually an agent and has been protecting her all along.

Heartbroken and betrayed, Sam tries to readjust to college life, but an attempt to make James jealous only results in her drunken photo splashed across tabloid articles. She returns home to help her father on the last stretch of his campaign, while James is disciplined for failure to act in a manner becoming of an agent. Sam asks her father to make sure James's career is not ruined by their romance, to which he agrees.

The President wins re-election and dances with Sam at his inauguration ball, referencing something she told him in his speech and acknowledging she is now a grown woman and worthy of his respect. She is surprised and pleased to see that James is in attendance at the ball, having been reassigned to the presidential detail. They dance, and he gives her keys to an old Volkswagen (her dream car) and encourages her to go "break some rules."

The film ends with Sam driving off in her car heading back to college and the narrator telling us that she will be back in the Spring, and reunite with James.

Cast
Katie Holmes as Samantha MacKenzie
Marc Blucas as James Lansome
Amerie as Mia Thompson
Michael Keaton as U.S President John MacKenzie
Margaret Colin as U.S First Lady Melanie MacKenzie
Lela Rochon as Liz Pappas, the President's personal secretary (as Lela Rochon Fuqua)
Michael Milhoan as Agent Bock
Dwayne Adway as Agent Dylan
Barry Livingston as Press Secretary
Steve Tom as Senator Downer
Peter White as College Dean
Parry Shen as Rally Leader
Marilyn McIntyre as Teacher at Party
Teck Holmes as Mia's Flame
Justine Wachsberger as Passing Student
Andy Umberger as Secret Service Supervisor
Kent Shocknek as Contentious Reporter
Vera Wang as herself
Conan O'Brien as himself
Joan Rivers as herself
Melissa Rivers as herself
Jay Leno as himself
Forest Whitaker as narrator

Production
The film began development in March 1999, when actor Jerry O'Connell sold a screenplay he had written to Regency Enterprises for a six figure sum, with O'Connell also intending to star in the film. Originally to shoot in the summer of that year, the project was pushed back to the spring of 2000 (under the direction of Brian Robbins) to allow O'Connell to film Mission to Mars, and then Rob Thomas was hired to rewrite the script. For unknown reasons, the film was not produced at that time, although O'Connell later received a "story by" credit for the film from the Writers Guild of America. (The film's original producer, Mike Karz, was also credited as a producer in the final print of the film.)

Filming began on June 2, 2003 on a budget of $30 million, and continued into July. The film was shot on location in Southern California. For the opening scene, where Samantha descends a red-carpeted stairway, the lobby of the Los Angeles Theatre in Los Angeles was used, while the auditorium of the building was used for a scene where Samantha and James go to see a movie. On-campus scenes were shot at UCLA, and the Huntington Library in San Marino stood in for the exterior of the building in the first scene.

Reception

Critical response
The film received negative reviews. Rotten Tomatoes gives it an 8% approval rating based on reviews from 86 critics, with an average rating of 3.7/10. The site's critical consensus reads, "First Daughter is a bland and charmless fairy tale that fails to rise above the formula". On Metacritic, the film has a score of 31 out of 100 based on reviews from 24 critics, indicating "generally unfavorable reviews". Reviewer Mike McGranaghan pointed out that the film was very similar to that of the concurrently-made film Chasing Liberty, which coincidentally had the working title First Daughter, and which also involved a plot where the President's daughter tried to experience life away from the White House.

Manohla Dargis of The New York Times gave the film a negative review and wrote it "Plays more like a nightmare than a dream, and an exceedingly unnerving one at that. Sam isn't just a prisoner of her parents' ambitions; like nearly everyone else in this film, she's a zombie, sleepwalking through life while Rome burns." Michael O'Sullivan of The Washington Post called the film, "One hackneyed, inauthentic, predictable scene after another."

The Spokesman-Review describes the film being "crammed full of threadbare fairy-tale imagery" and that "the plot has as much energy as the old Gephardt campaign".

Box office
The film was a financial failure. Opening in fifth place at the box office, First Daughter totaled at $9.1 million in domestic ticket sales and $10.4 million worldwide. It was Katie Holmes's second least successful mainstream film after Teaching Mrs. Tingle. The film performed better on home video and DVD, where it made $13.14 million in combined rentals and sales.

Notes

External links
Official site

First Daughter at Metacritic

2000s American films
2000s English-language films
2004 romantic comedy films
20th Century Fox films
American romantic comedy films
American teen comedy films
Davis Entertainment films
Films about fictional presidents of the United States
Films directed by Forest Whitaker
Films produced by John Davis
Films produced by Wyck Godfrey
Films scored by Blake Neely
Films scored by Michael Kamen
Films set in a movie theatre
Films set in the White House
Films set in universities and colleges
Regency Enterprises films